Khánh Bình is a  commune in the Trần Văn Thời District of Cà Mau Province, Vietnam on the Gulf of Thailand. As of 2007 the commune had a population of 11,598 and covers an area of 37.04 square kilometers.

The commune has 9 villages. Khánh Hải borders the communes of Binh Đồng Khánh and An Loi, and U Minh District. Marine transportation is prevalent in the area. Industry is based on fishing, notably crabs, and blue shrimp.

A bird flu epidemic struck the commune of Khánh Bình.

References

Communes of Cà Mau province
Populated places in Cà Mau province